The men's BMX racing competition of the cycling events at the 2019 Pan American Games was held on August 8 and August 9 at the Circuito BMX.

Schedule

Results

Time Trials 
14 riders from 10 countries was started

Semifinals 
First 4 riders in each semifinal qualify to final.

Semifinal 1

Semifinal 2

Final

References 

Cycling at the 2019 Pan American Games
BMX at the Pan American Games